Paolo Piapan (born 31 August 1956, in Trieste) is a retired Italian triple jumper.

Biography
He finished fifth at the 1971 European Indoor Championships in Milan.

His personal best jump was 16.54 metres, achieved in May 1979 in Salsomaggiore. The Italian record currently belongs to Fabrizio Donato with 17.60 metres. He has 23 caps in national team from 1975 to 1986.

National titles
Paolo Piapan has won 5 times the individual national championship.
3 wins in the triple jump (1976, 1978, 1981)
2 wins in the triple jump indoor (1978, 1979)

See also
 Triple jump winners of Italian Athletics Championships

References

External links
 
 Paolo Piapan at All-athletics.com

1956 births
Italian male triple jumpers
Living people